SS Lochness was a David MacBrayne Ltd mail steamer launched in 1929. She served Stornoway until 1947 and as relief vessel until 1955. As Myrtidiotissa, she survived in the Aegean until the 1970s.

History
SS Lochness was a mail steamer, built by Harland and Wolff, Govan, the first of four new vessels built under the terms of the constitution of the new company, David MacBrayne (1928) Ltd. She was the third vessel to carry the name and the last steamship ordered by MacBrayne's. Launched on 6 June 1929, she ran trials on 9 July and gave her first public service, to Tarbert, Loch Fyne, during Glasgow Fair Holiday.

As Myrtidiotissa, she survived in the Aegean until the 1970s.

Layout
Lochness was a cargo and passenger boat, with sleeping accommodation. She loaded vehicles along with other cargo, using crane and sling.

Service
Lochness was built for the Mallaig - Kyle - Stornoway route, to replace  which had been wrecked in 1927. She entered service on this route on 1 August 1929 and soon became too small for the route. Until 1955, she was found throughout the Outer Hebrides deputising for other vessels.

Footnotes

Ferries of Scotland
Ships built in Govan
1929 ships
SS Lochness
Ships built by Harland and Wolff